A caravanserai was a roadside inn where caravans and travelers could rest overnight.

They are typically constructed around a central courtyard, can be used as markets and are found from North Africa and the Aegean to India and Western China-although the majority are found between Iran and Turkey. Hundreds of these structures were built over the centuries.

The following is a partial list:

Albania
 Elbasan Inn, Korçë, Albania

Armenia

 Orbelian's Caravanserai, Vayots Dzor Province

Azerbaijan

Caravanserai of Masjid, Mashtaga, Baku
Ziyadlu Caravanserai, Baku
Gala Caravanserai, Baku
Dash Caravanserai, Gobustan District
Shirvanbey Caravanserai, Shamakhi District
Gurbulag, Ismailli District
Multani Caravanserai,Baku
Mahattin Caravanserai, Ganja
Kur River Caravanserai, Sabirabad District
Haji Nazar Caravanserai, Julfa District

Croatia
Maškovića Han, Vrana, Zadar County

Bosnia and Herzegovina

Morića Han, Sarajevo
Han Mehmed-paše Kukavice, Foča

Cyprus

Büyük Han
Kumarcilar Han

Egypt
Wikala of Sultan al-Ghuri, Cairo
Wikala of Sultan Qaytbay (at Bab al-Nasr), Cairo
Wikala of Sultan Qaytbay (at al-Azhar), Cairo
Wikala Bazar'a, Cairo

India

Mughal Serai
Mughal Serai, Doraha
Mughal Sarai, Surat
Nampally Sarai
Sarai Kale Khan
Serai Lashkari Khan
Serai Nurmahal
Shaikpet Sarai
Taramati Baradari
Fatehpur Sikri

Iraq
Khan al-Rubu', Karbala

Iran

Amin al-tojar Caravansarai, Kashmar, Iran
Aminoddole Carvansarai, in the Kashan Bazaar, Kashan, Iran
The Mothers Inn caravanserai (today's Abbasi Hotel) in Isfahan
Caravanserai of Seen in Isfahan
Qoosheh Amirabad Caravansary, Damghan
Caravanserai of Ganjali khan in Kerman
Hambari Caravanserai, Bisotun
Caravanserai Mahyar, Isfahan
Amin Abad caravanserai Kermanshah
Caravanserai-i-Shah, Qazvin
Caravanserai of Sa'd al-Saltaneh, Qazvin
Ganjali Khan Complex
Caravanserai of Sa'd al-Saltaneh
Qasr-e Shirin Caravanserai
Ilkhanid caravanserai
Caravanserai of Shah Abbas, Isfahan
Shah Abbasi Caravanserai, Karaj
Shah Abbasi Caravanserai, Rey
Neyestanak Caravanserai, Isfahan Province
Zeinodin Caravanserai, Yazd
Amir Chakhmaq Complex, Yazd
Izadkhast Caravanserai, Izadkhast

Kyrgyzstan
Tash Rabat

Lebanon
Khan El Franj - Saida 
Khan El AShkar - Tyre 
Khan El Saboun - Tripoly 
Khan El Askar - Tripoly 
Khan El Masriyin - Tripoly 
Khan El Khayatin - Tripoly 
Khan Antonin - Beirut

North Macedonia
Kapan Han, Skopje
Suli An, Skopje
Kuršumli An, Skopje

Morocco

Funduq Kettanin, Fes
Funduq al-Najjariyyin (Fondouk Nejjarine), Fes
Funduq Sagha, Fes
Funduq Shamma'in & Funduq Sbitriyyin, Fes
Funduq Staouniyyin (Funduq al-Tetwaniyyin), Fes

Pakistan
Akbari Sarai, Lahore
Gorkhatri caravanserai, Peshawar

Palestine and Israel

Alphabetically, without taking article into consideration (el-, al-, etc.).
Arab Suqrir/Bnei Darom, Israel
Avdat, Negev, Israel
Daughters of Jacob Bridge (Gesher Bnot Ya'akov/Jisr Benat Ya'kub): ruins of Mamluk khan; Israel
Inn of the Good Samaritan, known in Arabic as Khan al-Hatruri and less often as Khan el-Ahmar; West Bank
Jisr el-Majami (Old Gesher): Mamluk khan; Israel
Jubb Yussef (Joseph's Well) near Ami'ad: khan near the well, Galilee, Israel
Khan el-Hilu, Lod, Israel
Khan al-Lubban between al-Lubban ash-Sharqiya and Sinjil, West Bank
Khan al-Tujjar (Mount Tabor), Israel
Khan al-Tujjar (Nablus), West Bank
Khan al-Umdan, Acre, Israel
Khan Yunis, Gaza Strip
Khirbat al-Minya: Umayyad qasr reused as a khan; Israel
Khan el-Lajjun near Tel Megiddo, Israel
Laura of Euthymius, known in Arabic as Khan el-Ahmar; West Bank
Sha'ar HaGai (Bab el-Wad): Ottoman khan, Highways 1 and 38 junction, Israel
Solomon's Pools: Ottoman khan, "Qal'at el-Burak" or "Qal'at Murad"; West Bank
Tiberias: on the promenade facing the Sea of Galilee, Israel

Romania
Hanul lui Manuc, Bucharest
Hanul Gabroveni, Bucharest

Serbia

Stari Han, Kremna, Užice
Stari Han, Sopot, Belgrade
Stari Han, Kosjerić
Ram Caravanserai, Ram

Spain
Corral del Carbón

Syria

Khan Tuman
Khan As'ad Pasha, Damascus
Khan al-Harir, Damascus
Khan Jaqmaq, Damascus
Khan Sulayman Pasha, Damascus
Khan al-Arous
Khan al-Wazir, Aleppo

Turkey

Ağzıkara Han, Aksaray Province
Büyük Valide Han, Istanbul
Büyük Yeni Han, Istanbul
Caravanserai of Zor, Iğdır
Hafsa Sultan Caravanserai, Marmaris
Hanabad caravanserai, Çardak
Koza Han, Bursa
Kürkçü Han, Istanbul
Kurtkulağı Kervansarayı, Ceyhan
Öküz Mehmed Pasha Caravanserai, Kuşadası
Öküz Mehmet Pasha Complex, Ulukışla
Rüstem Pasha Caravanserai (Edirne)
Rüstem Pasha Caravanserai (Ereğli)
Rüstem Pasha Caravanserai, Erzurum
Sokollu Mehmet Pasha caravanserai, Payas
Sultan Han, Aksaray Province
Sultan Han, Kayseri Province
Suluhan, Ankara
Taşhan caravanserai, Hekimhan
Zincirli Hanı (inside Grand Bazaar), Istanbul

Uzbekistan

Kanka
Ribat-i Malik, also spelled Rabati Malik - ruined caravanserai

Caravanserais